Bill Bredde (December 31, 1932 – September 16, 2006) was an American football defensive back and halfback. He played for the Chicago Cardinals in 1954.

References

1932 births
2006 deaths
American football defensive backs
American football halfbacks
Oklahoma State Cowboys football players
Chicago Cardinals players